Yinwum is an extinct Paman language formerly spoken on the Cape York Peninsula of Queensland, Australia, by the Yinwum people. It is unknown when it became extinct. Historically, it underwent some unusual phonological changes that are difficult to classify and understand in phonetic terms.

Phonology

Consonant Phonemes

Vowel Phonemes

References 

Northern Paman languages